Chlortoluron or chlorotoluron are the common names for an organic compound of the phenylurea class of herbicides used to control broadleaf and annual grass weeds in cereal crops.

History
In 1952, chemists at E. I. du Pont de Nemours and Company patented a series of aryl urea derivatives as herbicides. Several compounds covered by this patent were commercialized as herbicides: monuron (4-chlorophenyl), diuron (3,4-dichlorophenyl) and chlortoluron, the 3-chloro-4-methylphenyl example. Subsequently, over thirty related urea analogs with the same mechanism of action reached the market worldwide.

Synthesis
As described in the du Pont patent, the starting material is a substituted aryl amine, an aniline, which is treated with phosgene to form its isocyanate derivative. This is subsequently reacted with dimethylamine to give the final product.
Aryl-NH2 + COCl2 → Aryl-NCO
Aryl-NCO + NH(CH3)2 → Aryl-NHCON(CH3)2

Mechanism of action
The phenylurea class of herbicides including chlortoluron are inhibitors of photosynthesis. They block the QB plastoquinone binding site of photosystem II, preventing electron flow from QA to QB. This interrupts the photosynthetic electron transport chain and kills the plant.

Usage
Chlortoluron was first licensed for use in the European Union in 1994 and this has been extended, currently until October 2021. It is now mainly used in mixture with other herbicides including diflufenican and pendimethalin.

It can be used to control broadleaf weeds and grasses including Alopecurus myosuroides, Anthemis arvensis, Atriplex prostrata, Calendula spp., Convolvulaceae spp., Galeopsis spp., Lamium spp., Papaver rhoeas, Paspalum distichum, Poa annua, Solanaceae spp., Stellaria media  and Veronica spp. It is mainly used in cereal crops including wheat and barley.

References

Herbicides
Ureas
Chloroarenes
Anilines